Milton T. Murray (June 1, 1898 – October 3, 1991) was a teacher, lawyer and politician from Milwaukee, Wisconsin.

Born in Milwaukee, Murray went to University of Wisconsin–Milwaukee, Marquette University, and the University of Chicago. He worked as a teacher and coach and then went into the practice of law. He served in the Wisconsin State Assembly before getting elected to the Wisconsin Senate.

He was elected to the Wisconsin State Senate's 4th District (the thirteenth, eighteenth, and twenty-first wards of the City of Milwaukee; and the Villages of Fox Point, River Hills, Shorewood, Whitefish Bay, and the Town of Milwaukee) in 1939 to fill the vacancy created by the death of incumbent Oscar Morris. He was re-elected in 1940 for a full term, with 24,919 votes to 9,258 for Democrat Thomas Nimlos and 8,346 for Progressive nominee Anton Blechinger.

Murray was a candidate in the Republican primary for Governor of Wisconsin twice. In 1942 he challenged incumbent Julius P. Heil, coming in second in a three-way race, with 95,908 votes to Heil's 136,980 and 32,740 for a third candidate; reporters speculated that Murray's high results in normally Progressive districts were the product of mischievous votes from Progressives (who did not have a contest on their ballot line). Heil went on to lose to Progressive Orland Steen Loomis in the general election. In 1944, rather than run for re-election, Murray challenged Acting Governor Walter Samuel Goodland, and came in third in a five-man race.

References

Republican Party Wisconsin state senators
Politicians from Milwaukee
Marquette University alumni
University of Wisconsin–Milwaukee alumni
University of Chicago alumni
Educators from Wisconsin
Wisconsin lawyers
1898 births
1991 deaths
20th-century American politicians
Lawyers from Milwaukee
20th-century American lawyers
Republican Party members of the Wisconsin State Assembly